Jesuit Volunteer Corps (JVC) Northwest connects people with one or more years of volunteer service that focus on JVC Northwest's values of community, spirituality/reflection, simple living, and social & ecological justice. JVC Northwest provides opportunities for individuals to reach out to persons living on the margins of society and vulnerable places throughout the Pacific Northwest. Jesuit Volunteers live together and serve with partner agencies in both rural and urban locales throughout Alaska, Idaho, Montana, Oregon and Washington.

History
Jesuit Volunteer Corps Northwest started in 1956 with several committed volunteers who built and taught in the newly formed Copper Valley School for Alaska Native and non-Native children. Under the sponsorship of the Oregon Province of the Society of Jesus (Jesuits), the Jesuit Volunteers expanded out of Alaska in the 1960s. They began living and working with Native American communities throughout the Northwest region, as well as serving in inner city placements in Washington and Oregon and beyond. From its roots in the Northwest, the Jesuit Volunteer Corps has spread throughout the United States and abroad. Over the past 65 years, over 12,000 individuals have served as Jesuit Volunteers through JVC and JVC Northwest, with more than 7,000 of those serving in the Northwest.

Between 1974 and 1980, Jesuit Volunteer Corps established new chapters as it expanded beyond the Northwest: International, South, Southwest, East, and Midwest. In 2009, five of the six Jesuit Volunteer Corps organizations merged to form an organization called Jesuit Volunteer Corps to share resources for one common mission. JVC Northwest made a decision to remain an independent region when the remaining chapters decided to unite. Both groups continue to collaborate. JVC Northwest states its commitment to providing well-supported volunteers to address the most urgent needs in the Pacific Northwest.

Leading up to 2010, through JVC Northwest's partnership with Catholic Volunteer Network (CVN), Jesuit Volunteers were eligible to receive the AmeriCorps Segal Education Award. In 2010, JVC Northwest received a three-year National Direct AmeriCorps award with a focus on capacity building, which has been renewed each subsequent cycle since. In 2022, JVC Northwest received a new Public Health AmeriCorps grant which focuses on increasing access to medical care in marginalized communities through outreach and accompaniment.  

As an AmeriCorps partner, Jesuit Volunteers serving in AmeriCorps positions receive additional benefits including a living stipend, student loan forbearance and an education award upon the completion of their service year and 1700 hours of service. As of 2023 the AmeriCorps Education Award is $6,895.  

In 2012, JV Northwest began the JV EnCorps program to provide Northwest communities with the service and gifts of older adults who are dedicated to social and ecological justice. JV EnCorps members contribute part-time service and gather together monthly for reflection and formation on the Ignatian values of community, spirituality, simple living and social and ecological justice. As of 2023, there are seven JV EnCorps groups in six Northwest cities. 

With the advent of our JV and JV EnCorps programs, JVC Northwest brings intergenerational opportunities for service, contributing to more just and equitable communities in the Pacific Northwest. 

As part of its ongoing diversity, equity, and inclusion work, in 2021 JVC Northwest released an Acknowledgment of History which unpacks its complex history.

Values
JVC Northwest has four stated values: community, simple living, social & ecological justice, and spirituality/reflection. Jesuit Volunteers make a commitment to the JVC Northwest program and to their service placements to strive to live these four values. JVC Northwest staff, board and former volunteers also endeavor to live their lives in accordance with these values. 

Community: 
Jesuit Volunteers (JVs) and JV EnCorps members practice inclusive, intentional community, where all genders, sexual orientations, cultural identities, faith backgrounds, abilities, and economic statuses are welcomed and celebrated. JVs live with three to seven other JVs in a simply furnished house or apartment provided by JVC Northwest. JV EnCorps members meet monthly to build community with one another. In community, we learn that our lives are interdependent, we have a responsibility to others, and we come together to support one another. 

Simple Living: 
Simple living is an invitation to live more intentionally and to choose presence and mindfulness over the noise and clutter of a mainstream, capitalist lifestyle. Simple living allows JVs and JV EnCorps members to more fully connect with the communities they serve alongside and to more intently focus on relationships over objects. For some, this is a new concept that can be challenging and rewarding. Though many forms of technology have evolved in recent years from luxury to necessity, many volunteers choose to take a critical look at their relationship and habits with technology and challenge themselves to be more intentional about their interactions with it. 

Social and Ecological Justice: 
JVC Northwest volunteers work for peace and justice by being aware of how attitudes and behavior affect others. Being aware urges us to change the attitudes and structures which create poverty, perpetuate oppression, and destroy ecological systems. Solidarity demands that we create change by working alongside people who suffer the effects of social and ecological injustice. We affirm the interconnectedness of life by making efforts to reduce our impact on the Earth. Volunteers live out this value each day, many through their service placement involvement, and within their communities through practices like limiting the use of resources, being intentional about how money is spent, transportation choices, choosing to compost, staying educated, and more.

Spirituality/Reflection: 
JVC Northwest volunteers bring to community life a rich diversity of spiritual backgrounds and belief systems. This diversity invites communities to practice reflective listening and conversation in order to deepen and broaden their wonder and appreciation of the myriad ways spirituality can connect us to each other and to the Earth. Volunteers live out their spiritual values by participating in and facilitating community spirituality/reflection gatherings, and by participating in retreats throughout the year. The cornerstone of the JVC Northwest year is having the on-going time and space to reflect on one’s transformative service experience.

See also
Jesuit Volunteer Corps

References

External links
Official Website

Society of Jesus
Catholic lay organisations
Non-profit organizations based in the United States